Gordon James McMaster (13 February 1960 – 28 July 1997) was a Scottish politician and horticulturist.

Life and career
McMaster was born in Johnstone. A horticulturist by training, he was also a lecturer at his alma mater, the Woodburn House Horticultural College. McMaster was very well-liked by his students for his knowledge and charm.

In 1980, McMaster was elected to the Johnstone Community Council, and became its chair in 1982, at the age of 22, making him the youngest chair of any Scottish council. He was elected to the Renfrew District Council in 1984 and became its leader in 1987. He was elected to the House of Commons for Paisley South in a 1990 by-election, triggered by the death of Norman Buchan. In parliament, he campaigned for the rights of disabled people and against recreational drug use. He served as an opposition whip.

Death
McMaster committed suicide in the garage of his home in Johnstone on 28 July 1997, at the age of 37. He had been robbed in London shortly before his death. His suicide note named neighbouring MP Tommy Graham as being responsible for smearing him over an alleged homosexual relationship. This was denied by Graham, who was subsequently expelled from the Labour Party.

References

External links 
 Obituary from The Scotsman

1960 births
1997 deaths
20th-century Scottish educators
British politicians who committed suicide
Members of the Parliament of the United Kingdom for Paisley constituencies
People from Johnstone
Scottish Labour MPs
Scottish Labour councillors
Scottish horticulturists
Suicides by carbon monoxide poisoning
Suicides in Scotland
UK MPs 1987–1992
UK MPs 1992–1997
UK MPs 1997–2001